The Gulfstream Aerospace Peregrine was a single-engine business jet prototype aircraft developed in the United States by Gulfstream Aerospace in the early 1980s. It was developed from the company's Hustler business aircraft and the company's military trainer aircraft, the Peregrine 600.

Design and development

The Peregrine was originally known as the Commander Fanjet 1500, and as such it flew for the first time on 14 January 1983. After the cancellation of the Peregrine 600, the Fanjet 1500 was renamed Peregrine. The Hustler's forward fuselage design (with a new nose) was used for the Peregrine, while the Peregrine 600's wings, tail and rear fuselage were incorporated into the new type. In 1984 Gulfstream Aerospace announced that it would go ahead with production after receiving 27 orders with paid deposits. However Gulfstream's inability to produce a design that met regulatory requirements (especially the requirement then in force - since rescinded - that single-engine aircraft have a maximum stalling speed of 61 knots), combined with insufficient orders, resulted in the program being terminated in 1985. The prototype airframe N84GP is on display in the aviation wing of the Science Museum in Oklahoma City, Oklahoma.

Specifications (proposed production version)

See also

References

1980s United States business aircraft
Peregrine
Single-engined jet aircraft
Abandoned civil aircraft projects of the United States
Low-wing aircraft
Aircraft first flown in 1983